Shilpa Shetty is an Indian actress, film producer, author, businesswoman and former model. Known primarily for her work in Hindi films, she has also appeared in Telugu, Kannada and Tamil films. Shetty made her acting debut opposite Shah Rukh Khan in the 1993 thriller Baazigar. Shetty's performance earned her two Filmfare Awards nominations for Lux New Face of the Year and Best Supporting Actress. She subsequently earned wide recognition with dual roles in the 1994 action-comedy Main Khiladi Tu Anari. After initial success, Shetty's films fared poorly at the box office for the next five years. Films Shetty starred in including action drama Aag, romantic drama Aao Pyaar Karen, comedy Haathkadi and Chhote Sarkar proved to be financially unsuccessful. However, Shetty received Best Supporting Actress at the Zee Gold Bollywood Awards for romantic drama Pardesi Babu.

The 2000 romantic drama Dhadkan marked a turning point in her career, earning her several nominations in the Best Actress category at various award ceremonies. Shetty rose to prominence by featuring as the lead female in top-grossing films such as family drama Apne, police drama Garv: Pride and Honour and musical drama Life in a... Metro. Her comic performance as an eccentric fisherwoman in 2002 action-drama release Rishtey earned her a nomination for the Filmfare Best Supporting Actress Award. Shetty became a global figure after winning the 2007 British reality television series Celebrity Big Brother, after comments made by other contestants about Shetty fell afoul of Ofcom rules and caused an international controversy over racism.

Shetty made her debut in South Indian cinema in the Tamil-language musical action film Mr. Romeo (1996). Shetty subsequently played lead roles in the Telugu films such as action drama Sahasa Veerudu Sagara Kanya (1996), comedy drama Veedevadandi Babu (1996) with Mohan Babu, and the action drama Azad (2000). She had a successful career in Kannada cinema with releases such as Preethsod Thappa, Ondagona Baa and Auto Shankar. Shetty has served as a talent judge for reality shows Zara Nachke Dikha, Nach Baliye, and Super Dancer.

Film

Television

Web series

Music videos

Notes

References

External links
 

Actress filmographies
Indian filmographies